George Henderson (15 December 1873– unknown) was a Scottish footballer who played in the Football League for Nottingham Forest and Preston North End.

References

1873 births
Scottish footballers
People from Blantyre, South Lanarkshire
Footballers from South Lanarkshire
English Football League players
Scottish Football League players
Scottish Junior Football Association players
Association football wing halves
Burnbank Athletic F.C. players
Motherwell F.C. players
Airdrieonians F.C. (1878) players
Preston North End F.C. players
Swindon Town F.C. players
Millwall F.C. players
Nottingham Forest F.C. players
Hamilton Academical F.C. players
Year of death missing